Jerry Vivino (born January 8, 1954) is an American musician.

Biography 
He was a member of the Basic Cable Band, the house band for the TBS late night program Conan.  He was also a member of The Tonight Show Band, the house band on The Tonight Show with Conan O'Brien and its predecessor, Late Night with Conan O'Brien on NBC.

Raised in Glen Rock, New Jersey, Vivino graduated in 1972 from Glen Rock High School.

Vivino provides saxophone, woodwinds and vocals.
Jerry Vivino has three children, Donna Vivino, Michael J. Vivino, and Danny Vivino.

Personal
Vivino is the younger brother of longtime New Jersey TV host Floyd Vivino, a.k.a. Uncle Floyd, and the older brother of Max Weinberg 7 bandmate Jimmy Vivino, the former band leader of the Basic Cable Band.  His daughter, Donna, is a theatre actress and singer.

References

External links

1954 births
American male singers
Musicians from Paterson, New Jersey
American people of Italian descent
The Max Weinberg 7 members
Living people
Jersey Shore musicians
Singers from New Jersey
Guitarists from New Jersey
American male guitarists
20th-century American guitarists
Jimmy Vivino and the Basic Cable Band members
The Tonight Show Band members
Glen Rock High School alumni
People from Glen Rock, New Jersey